Mohamed Mihoubi is an Algerian football manager.

References

Year of birth missing (living people)
Living people
Algerian football managers
CA Bordj Bou Arréridj managers
RC Arbaâ managers
MSP Batna managers
Algerian Ligue Professionnelle 1 managers
21st-century Algerian people